Founding Farmers is an American upscale-casual restaurant owned by North Dakota Farmers Union and Farmers Restaurant Group. The restaurant was founded in 2008 when Farmers Restaurant Group owners Dan Simons and Michael Vucurevich partnered up with North Dakota Farmers Union to open Founding Farmers on Pennsylvania Avenue in Washington, D.C. Founding Farmers is the first Leed Gold Designed restaurant in Washington, D.C. The restaurant is headquartered in Kensington, MD and has locations in DC, Maryland, Virginia, and Pennsylvania. Founding Farmers also has two sister restaurants, Farmers Fishers Bakers and Farmers & Distillers, both located in Washington, D.C.

History 
In 2005, members of North Dakota Farmers Union (NDFU) were interested in developing a restaurant where guests could have access to, and benefit from, food grown, raised, and harvested on American family farms. NDFU first started a restaurant called Agraria, which failed due to numerous factors. North Dakota Farmers Union soon partnered with restaurateurs, Dan Simons and Michael Vucurevich, and opened the first of their restaurants, Founding Farmers DC, in 2008.

Founding Farmers restaurants were sued in 2017 for overtime and wage violations. The lawsuit alleged they had employees work at different restaurants to get around having to pay overtime wages, had to share tips with managers, denied sick leave, and required employees to attend meetings without being paid. Founding Farmers agreed to pay up to $1.49 million to settle the lawsuit.

Menu 
The menu varies slightly by location, each incorporating local tastes and trends. All of the food prepared in Founding Farmers kitchens is made in-house daily, and all locations are part of the Certified Green Restaurant® Association. All bread is baked at their in-house bakery, with approximately 118,000 loaves baked per year. Their most popular items include: cornbread, chicken and waffles, grilled cheese with tomato soup, and bacon lollies. In 2013, Founding Farmers published a cookbook with 100 of their menu items. Their bar has gained recognition for their pre-prohibition style cocktails, wine, and craft beer.

Reviews 

Travel and Leisure Magazine named Founding Farmers “The Best Farm-To-Table” in Washington, D.C. In 2015, Founding Farmers gained recognition in the New York Times for their gender-neutral restrooms. In early 2011, Chef Robert Irvine discusses Founding Farmers’ Devilish-Eggs on Food Network’s “The Best Thing I Ever Ate”. In June 2016, popular food critic Tom Sietsema reviewed Founding Farmers in The Washington Post, giving the restaurant a 0-star rating. Founding Farmers Sets DC Record For Number of Yelp Reviews

Awards 
 Washington City Paper – Best of D.C. 2019, 2019
 Huffington Post – The 10 Most Sustainable Restaurants, 2016
 Travel + Leisure – The Best Farm-to-Table Restaurant in Every State, 2016
 Mail Line Today – 20 Best New Restaurants on the Main Line
 Washington City Paper – Best of DC Best Bloody Mary, 2015
 Bethesda Magazine – Best of Bethesda 2018 Best Restaurant in Potomac, 2018
 Bethesda Magazine – Best of Bethesda 2018 Best Brunch, 2018
 Bethesda Magazine – Best of Bethesda 2018 Best Cocktails, 2018
 OpenTable – Most Booked Restaurant on OpenTable in the U.S.

Locations 
In 2019, Founding Farmers has five locations throughout the Washington, D.C. Metropolitan area and King of Prussia, PA. Founding Farmers also has two sister restaurants in Washington, D.C., Farmers Fishers Bakers in Georgetown's Washington Harbour and Farmers & Distillers in Mt. Vernon Square.

References

External links
 
 
 

Restaurants established in 2008
Restaurants in Washington, D.C.
2008 establishments in Washington, D.C.